The Departmental Council of Gard is the deliberative assembly of the department of Gard in the region of Occitanie. It consists of 46 members (general councilors) from 23 cantons and its headquarters are in Nîmes.

The President of the General Council is Françoise Laurent-Perrigot.

Vice-Presidents 
The President of the Departmental Council is assisted by 13 vice-presidents chosen from among the departmental advisers. Each of them has a delegation of authority.

See also 

 Gard
 General councils of France

References

External links 
 

Gard
Departments of Occitania (administrative region)
Occitania (administrative region)